The California State Relief Administration (SRA), created in 1935, was the successor to the State Emergency Relief Administration (SERA), created in 1933. The agencies were responsible for distributing state and federal funds to improve conditions in California during the Great Depression, and administered unemployment relief.

References

Further reading
 
 

Defunct state agencies of California
New Deal in California
New Deal agencies
Unemployment in the United States
Economic history of California